The 2001 Brazilian Grand Prix (formally the XXX Grande Prêmio Marlboro do Brasil) was a Formula One motor race held on 1 April 2001 at the Autódromo José Carlos Pace, São Paulo, Brazil. It was the third race of the 2001 Formula One season. The 71-lap race was won by McLaren driver David Coulthard after starting from fifth position. Michael Schumacher finished second in a Ferrari with Nick Heidfeld third for the Sauber team.

The race was Coulthard's first win of the season, and the result meant he reduced the lead of Schumacher in the Drivers' Championship to six points along with moving up to second place, 10 points ahead of Rubens Barrichello. McLaren reduced the lead to Ferrari in the Constructors' Championship to 15 points, with 14 races of the season remaining.

Background
The Grand Prix was contested by 22 drivers, in eleven teams of two. The teams, also known as constructors, were Ferrari, McLaren, Williams, Benetton, BAR, Jordan, Arrows, Sauber, Jaguar, Minardi and Prost. Tyre suppliers Bridgestone and Michelin brought five different tyre types to the race: two dry compounds and three wet-weather tyres.

Going into the race, Ferrari driver Michael Schumacher led the Drivers' Championship with 20 points, ahead of Rubens Barrichello and David Coulthard who were tied for second on ten points each. Heinz-Harald Frentzen was fourth on five points with Nick Heidfeld in fifth with three points. In the Constructors' Championship, Ferrari were leading with 30 points; McLaren were second on eleven points. Jordan and Sauber were third and fourth with five and four points, respectively, with Williams fifth on two points. Ferrari and Michael Schumacher had so far dominated the championship, winning the previous two races. Championship competitors Barrichello and Coulthard had both achieved second- and third-place podium finishes.

Following the Malaysian Grand Prix on 18 March, the teams conducted testing sessions at the Circuit de Catalunya between 20–23 March to prepare for the upcoming Brazilian Grand Prix at the Autódromo José Carlos Pace. Ferrari test driver Luca Badoer set the quickest times on the first day, ahead of McLaren's test driver Alexander Wurz. Badoer remained-fastest on the second day. Marc Gené, the Williams test driver, stopped on track with a mechanical failure which brought a brief halt to testing. Michael Schumacher was fastest on the third day of testing. Seven suspensions were required as several drivers were afflicted by car problems or spinning off the circuit. Michael Schumacher stayed fastest for the final day's running.

The Autódromo José Carlos Pace underwent safety changes following the previous year's race. Twenty-one cabins were installed to protect marshals across the track in response to the death of marshal Graham Beveridge at the Australian Grand Prix. Animals roaming near the circuit perimeter were rounded up and taken to another location. A guard rail was installed at the Bico do Pato curve after the speed of Formula One cars had greatly increased from 2000. The gravel trap on the Reta Oposta straight was reinforced and the circuit's drainage system was repaired. The renovation work had been disrupted on 17 March when a contractor became dissatisfied with São Paulo city administration and enquiries were initiated. The dispute, over the delayed delivery of tables and chairs, was confirmed by race organisers and would not interfere with the Grand Prix. Barrichello was critical of the Grand Prix citing the dissatisfaction of some drivers in past years and the quality of the local facilities. However, the director of the event, Carlos Roberto Montagne disputed Barrichello's claims, stating that two engineers from the United Kingdom approved the road surface. The drivers, however, were unhappy at the work as the track still remained bumpy. McLaren driver Mika Häkkinen described the track as "very bumpy indeed. It seems to get worse and worse every year." Minardi's Fernando Alonso claimed that the bumping was so bad that the drivers could have lost their vision of the circuit.

Practice
Four practice sessions were held before the Sunday race—two on Friday, and two on Saturday. The Friday morning and afternoon sessions each lasted an hour. The third and final practice sessions were held on Saturday morning and lasted 45 minutes. The Friday practice sessions were held in dry weather conditions and on a dirty track which gradually cleaned up as the session progressed. Michael Schumacher outpaced the other drivers in the first practice session, setting a lap of 1:16.832. Häkkinen was second-fastest and was initially quickest during the first quarter of the session. The formation continued with Barrichello and Coulthard third- and fourth-fastest, respectively. Olivier Panis was fifth-quickest, ahead of both Jaguars of Eddie Irvine and Luciano Burti. Juan Pablo Montoya, Heidfeld and Jarno Trulli rounded out the top ten fastest drivers in the session. In the second practice session, Coulthard set the fastest lap of the day, a 1:15.520; one second quicker than Trulli. Michael Schumacher followed with the third-fastest time. The two Williams drivers of Montoya and Ralf Schumacher were fourth and sixth; they were separated by Häkkinen. Barrichello was seventh-quickest and spun off when his engine lost power because of an oil pressure loss. Frentzen, Heidfeld and Irvine followed in the top ten. It became hotter during the Saturday free practice sessions. Häkkinen set the pace in the third practice session, with a time of 1:14.503 with Coulthard second-quickest. Michael Schumacher and Barrichello were third- and fifth-fastest, separated by Ralf Schumacher. Montoya, Trulli, Frentzen, Heidfeld and Kimi Räikkönen rounded out the top ten. In the final practice session, Montoya was quickest with a lap of 1:13.963; Ralf Schumacher finished with the fourth-fastest time. They were split by the two McLarens, Häkkinen in second and Coulthard in third. Michael Schumacher finished fifth-fastest, ahead of Frentzen. Barrichello, Räikkönen, Panis and Heidfeld completed the top ten ahead of qualifying.

Qualifying
Saturday's afternoon qualifying session lasted for an hour. Each driver was limited to twelve laps, with the grid order decided by the drivers' fastest laps. During this session, the 107% rule was in effect, which necessitated each driver set a time within 107% of the quickest lap to qualify for the race. The session was held in dry and sunny weather conditions. The hot conditions prevented the front-running teams from improving their lap times towards the end of the session. Michael Schumacher clinched his seventh consecutive pole position, his third of the season and his first at the Interlagos circuit, with a time of 1:13.780. He was joined on the front row of the grid by Ralf Schumacher who set a qualifying time 0.310 seconds slower, equalling his team's best qualifying position since the 1998 Italian Grand Prix. The two became the first siblings to share the front row of the grid in a Formula One World Championship event. After the session had ended, Ralf Schumacher's car was investigated by the stewards for an fuel irregularity and was allowed to race when the fuel was declared legal. Häkkinen and Coulthard set the third- and fifth-fastest times for McLaren, respectively, both drivers agreed that their cars had a reduced tendency to understeer. Montoya separated the McLaren drivers in the second Williams, who complained that his car was difficult to drive having spun on his first quick lap and switched to the spare Williams for the remainder of the session. Barrichello was four tenths of a second slower than Michael Schumacher in sixth place, and blamed excessive understeer which caused him to have problems with handling. The two Jordans filled the fourth row of the grid with Trulli seventh and Frentzen eighth. This formation continued onto the fifth row which was occupied by Heidfeld and Räikkönen in the Saubers, with the former changing his set-up to move ahead of his teammate. The sixth row was filled by the BARs of Panis and Jacques Villeneuve and both drivers complained they had a lack of grip in the slow-speed corners. Irvine and Burti recorded the 13th- and 14th-fastest times in their Jaguars, ahead of Jean Alesi in the faster of the two Prosts. Enrique Bernoldi was 16th-quickest for the Arrows team, ahead of teammate Jos Verstappen. Giancarlo Fisichella and Jenson Button for the Benetton team secured the 18th and 20th positions, respectively, the pair endured poor balance and oil leaks in their engines. They were sandwiched by Alonso in the faster Minardi car. Gastón Mazzacane and Tarso Marques completed the final two positions on the grid.

Qualifying classification

Warm-up
The drivers took to the track at 11:30 BRT (UTC-3) for a 30-minute warm-up session. It took place in dry and hot weather conditions. Both Ferrari cars were running quickly throughout the session; Michael Schumacher had the fastest time, a 1:15.971 and also drove his race car and Ferrari's spare car in the half-hour period. Barrichello finished with the second-quickest time. Häkkinen was third-quickest, and Ralf Schumacher rounded out the top four, with a lap four tenths of a second slower than Michael Schumacher. Alonso went into the gravel trap and his car rested in the tyre barriers which caused damage to his front wing.

Race
The race started at 14:00 local time. A significant overtaking maneuver took place very early in the race. The safety car was brought onto the track because McLaren driver Mika Häkkinen had stalled on the starting grid. When the safety car came in, F1 rookie Juan Pablo Montoya overtook defending champion Michael Schumacher. Local hero Rubens Barrichello had problems before he even got on the grid and had to switch to the spare car.  He then slammed into the back of Ralf Schumacher on the restart, retiring on the spot. Ralf Schumacher limped back to the pits, but was in for a long time replacing the rear wing; he later spun off when the track was wet.

As Juan Pablo Montoya extended his lead, the stewards informed the Jaguar team that Eddie Irvine would be served with a 10-second stop-go penalty. Eddie Irvine took his penalty on Lap 6.

By lap 39 Montoya was leading by more than 30 seconds over Michael Schumacher. However, he retired after a crash while he was lapping Jos Verstappen. Verstappen let Montoya by, but as he pulled in behind Montoya while braking for turn 4 his Arrows slammed violently into the back of Montoya's Williams and both men were out of the race.

Soon after Montoya's retirement, a thunderstorm moved over the circuit and it began to rain heavily, which forced everyone to change tyres. Some went onto full-wet tyres, while others chose the intermediates.

Michael Schumacher was fighting understeer all race, and despite planning to stop twice instead of once was only able to run at the pace of Montoya and Coulthard. However, he was right back in the hunt after he had pitted early. He still needed to pit again for fuel anyway but was able to change tyres as well. Coulthard, who had made his one and only stop, stayed out an extra lap which at that point looked costly.

But then Schumacher, with a dry-weather set-up on his car, spun soon after exiting the pit lane, allowing Coulthard right back on his tail.

This led to a second important overtaking move of the race, this one by David Coulthard. He passed Schumacher with the aid of a backmarker, rather similar to his teammate Mika Häkkinen's move on Schumacher at the Belgian Grand Prix the previous season.

Coulthard went on to win, while Schumacher suffered another off on his way to second place. Nick Heidfeld took his first-ever podium driving for Sauber. It was also Sauber's first podium since Jean Alesi's at the 1998 Belgian Grand Prix.

Race classification 
Drivers who scored championship points are denoted in bold.

Championship standings after the race 

Drivers' Championship standings

Constructors' Championship standings

Note: Only the top five positions are included for both sets of standings.

References 

Brazilian Grand Prix
Brazilian Grand Prix
Grand Prix
Brazilian Grand Prix